Don't Fall may refer to:
 
"Don't Fall", song by post-punk band the Chameleons Script of the Bridge 1983
"Don't Fall", song by Heaven 17 from Naked as Advertised 2008 
"Don't Fall", song by Steve Hackett from Feedback 86 
"Don't Fall", song by White Lies from Friends (White Lies album)